The 23rd Golden Horse Awards (Mandarin:第23屆金馬獎) took place on  November 29, 1986 at Taipei City Arts Promotion Office in Taipei, Taiwan.

References

23rd
1986 film awards
1986 in Taiwan